is a city located in Chiba Prefecture, Japan.
, the city had an estimated population of  175,292 in 81,985 households and a population density of 8400 persons per km². The total area of the city is

Geography
Narashino is located in far northwestern Chiba Prefecture, bordered by Tokyo Bay to the southwest, and the prefectural capital of Chiba to the east. It is approximately 20 to 30 kilometers from central Tokyo.

The city is located on the Shimōsa Plateau and reclaimed land fill on Tokyo Bay, with a large difference in elevation from the inland area to the coastal area.

Surrounding municipalities
Chiba Prefecture
Chiba
Funabashi
Yachiyo

Climate
Narashino has a humid subtropical climate (Köppen Cfa) characterized by warm summers and cool winters with light to no snowfall.  The average annual temperature in Narashino is 15.4 °C. The average annual rainfall is 1410 mm with September as the wettest month. The temperatures are highest on average in August, at around 26.9 °C, and lowest in January, at around 4.9 °C.

Demographics
Per Japanese census data, the population of Narashino increased rapidly between 1950 and 1990 and has grown at a slower pace since.

History
The area around Narashino has been inhabited since prehistoric times. Archaeologists have found shell middens and numerous other remains from Jōmon period, as well as burial tumuli from the Kofun period. However, for most of its history, the area was a sparsely populated wetland and swamp along the northern shore of Edo Bay.

After the Meiji Restoration,  was founded within Chiba District on April 1, 1889 on the merger of five small hamlets with a total population of 4500 people. The area only began to develop with the coming of the railway, and Tsudanuma was raised to town status on March 3, 1903, with a population of 6000.

The Narashino area of Tsudanuma was used for cavalry maneuvers by the Imperial Guard and the early Imperial Japanese Army, and was visited by the Meiji Emperor early in the Meiji period (1868 – 1912). A prisoner of war camp was built in 1904 to house POWs from the Russo-Japanese War of 1904-1905 and World War I. The Imperial Japanese Army Narashino School was the main training school for cavalry, and later for tank warfare.

On August 1, 1954, Tsudanuma merged with a portion of the neighboring city of Chiba (the former town of Makuhari) to form the new city of Narashino.

Neighborhoods
 Akanehama
 Akitsu
 Fujisaki
 Hanasaki
 Higashi-Narashino
 Izumicho
 Kanadenomori
 Kasumi
 Mimomi
 Moto-Okubo
 Okubo
 Saginuma
 Saginumadai
 Shibazono
 Shin-ei
 Sodegaura
 Tsudanuma
 Yashiki
 Yatsu
 Yatsumachi

Government
Narashino has a mayor-council form of government with a directly elected mayor and a unicameral city council of 30 members. Narashino contributes two members to the Chiba Prefectural Assembly. In terms of national politics, the city is part of Chiba 2nd district of the lower house of the Diet of Japan.

Economy
Narashino is a regional commercial center and a bedroom community for nearby Chiba and Tokyo, with 32,7% of the residents commuting to Tokyo per the 2010 census, and 11.7% to Funabashi and 10.5% to Chiba. The coastal area, mostly on reclaimed land is part of the Keiyō Industrial Zone and is home to much heavy industry, especially related to chemical processing.

Transportation

Railways
 JR East –  Sōbu Main Line
 
 JR East –  Keiyō Line 
 -
 Keisei Electric Railway -  Main Line
 -  -  - 
 Keisei Electric Railway -  Chiba Line
 Keisei Tsudanuma 
  Shin-Keisei Electric Railway -  Shin-Keisei Line
 Keisei Tsudanuma -

Highways

Education
 Chiba Institute of Technology
Narashino has 16 public elementary schools and eight public middle schools operated by the city government, and four public high schools operated by the Chiba Prefectural Board of Education.

Local attractions

Akitsu Baseball Stadium
Frontier Soccer Field (naming rights from April 1, 2015 to March 31, 2018), formerly known as Akitsu Soccer Stadium.
Chiba International General Swimming Center
Ōnomatsu stable

Notable places
 Yatsu-higata (谷津干潟), a Ramsar Site and protected wetlands for migratory birds. The spring and summer months see an increase of jellyfish and small crabs to the wetlands.
 Yatsu Rose Garden (谷津バラ園), a rose garden which displays over 6,000 individual blossoms in May and October. The garden was founded with Yatsu Yūen (谷津遊園), an amusement park which was managed by Keisei Electric Railway and closed in 1982. When the park was closed, the city bought the garden, and has managed it since that time.

Sister city relations
 Tuscaloosa, Alabama, United States

Noted people from Narashino
Daiki Arioka, Hey! Say! JUMP
Kazuya Fukuura, professional baseball player for the Chiba Lotte Marines (1994–present)
Kota Hattori, professional soccer player
Hideaki Kitajima,– professional soccer player for Kashiwa Reysol (1997-2002, 2006-2012)
Makoto Sunakawa, professional soccer player
Daichi Suzuki, swimmer, Olympic gold medalist in 100m backstroke at 1988 Summer Olympics
Masaaki Takada, professional soccer player

References

External links

Official Website 

 
Cities in Chiba Prefecture
Populated coastal places in Japan